Longford is a civil parish in the Derbyshire Dales district of Derbyshire, England. The parish contains 22 listed buildings that are recorded in the National Heritage List for England. Of these, one is listed at Grade I, the highest of the three grades, four are at Grade II*, the middle grade, and the others are at Grade II, the lowest grade.  The parish contains the village of Longford and the surrounding area.  The major building in the parish is Longford Hall, which is listed, together with associated structures, and the adjacent farm and farm buildings.  The other listed buildings include a church, a cross and tombs in the churchyard, houses and cottages, farmhouses, a row of almshouses, now in ruins, two bridges, a former watermill, and a former cheese factory.


Key

Buildings

References

Citations

Sources

 

Lists of listed buildings in Derbyshire